Mikael Kurki is a Finnish professional ice hockey defenceman who currently plays for Espoo Blues of the SM-liiga.

References

Living people
Espoo Blues players
1987 births
Finnish ice hockey defencemen
Ice hockey people from Helsinki